Chelis cervini is a moth of the family Erebidae first described by Jules Ferdinand Fallou in 1864. It is endemic to the Alps and is found on altitudes of 2,600 to 3,200 meters.

The wingspan is about 30 mm. The species has one generation every two to three years.

The larvae feed on Alchemilla alpina and Plantago alpina.

This species was formerly a member of the genus Holoarctia, but was moved to Chelis along with the other species of the genera Holoarctia, Neoarctia, and Hyperborea.

References

External links

Fauna Europaea
Lepiforum e.V.

Arctiina
Moths of Europe
Moths described in 1864
Taxa named by Jules Ferdinand Fallou